Digitalization or digitalisation may refer to:

 Digital transformation, the increasing adoption of digital tools to market your product.
 Digitization, the conversion of non-digital or analog information into a digital format.
 Medical use of Digoxin
 Medical use of other Digitalis-based drugs

See also 
 Digital (disambiguation)
 Quantization (disambiguation)
 Digitation